Rayson is a surname. Notable people with the surname include:

Rayson Huang, CBE (born 1920), chemist
Anthony Rayson, American anarchist activist and author
Arthur Rayson (1898–1970), Australian rules footballer
Hannie Rayson (born 1957), Australian playwright
John Rayson (born 1949), Broward County, Florida attorney
Leland Rayson (1921–2001), American lawyer and politician
Noel Rayson (born 1933), former Australian rules footballer
Roger Rayson (born 1942), Australian cricketer
Rayson Tan, Singaporean MediaCorp actor

See also
Drayson
Grayson (disambiguation)
Rason